Lam Lap Hing (born 4 February 1958) is a Hong Kong judoka. He competed in the men's half-middleweight event at the 1988 Summer Olympics.

References

External links
 

1958 births
Living people
Hong Kong male judoka
Olympic judoka of Hong Kong
Judoka at the 1988 Summer Olympics
Place of birth missing (living people)